The 1947 Drake Bulldogs football team was an American football team that represented Drake University as a member of the Missouri Valley Conference during the 1947 college football season. In its first season under head coach Albert Kawal, the team compiled a 1–7–1 record (1–3 against MVC opponents), finished fourth in the conference, and was outscored by a total of 191 to 97. The team played its home games at Drake Stadium in Des Moines, Iowa.

Schedule

References

Drake
Drake Bulldogs football seasons
Drake Bulldogs football